Belsko is a village northwest of Postojna in the Inner Carniola region of Slovenia.

Church

The local church in the settlement is dedicated to Saint Justus and belongs to the Parish of Studeno.

References

External links

Belsko on Geopedia

Populated places in the Municipality of Postojna